The members of the 20th General Assembly of Newfoundland were elected in the Newfoundland general election held in October 1904. The general assembly sat from 1905 to 1908.

The Liberal Party led by Robert Bond formed the government.

Francis J. Morris was chosen as speaker.

Sir William MacGregor served as colonial governor of Newfoundland until 1907 when Newfoundland became a dominion and continued to serve as governor for the dominion until 1909.

Members of the Assembly 
The following members were elected to the assembly in 1904:

Notes:

By-elections 
By-elections were held to replace members for various reasons:

Notes:

References 

Terms of the General Assembly of Newfoundland and Labrador